Pokémon: Master Quest is the fifth season of Pokémon and the fifth and final season of Pokémon: The Original Series, known in Japan as . It originally aired in Japan from August 9, 2001, to November 14, 2002, on TV Tokyo, in the United States from September 14, 2002, to October 25, 2003, on Kids' WB. It was the first season of Pokémon to be digitally animated as opposed to cel animation, starting with the episode "Here's Lookin' at You, Elekid".

The season follows the adventures of the ten-year-old Pokémon trainer Ash Ketchum and his electric mouse partner Pikachu as they collect Gym Badges in the fictional Johto region so they can compete in the Johto League competition.

The episodes were directed by Masamitsu Hidaka and produced by the animation studio OLM.



Episode list

Music
The Japanese opening songs are "Aim to be a Pokémon Master" (めざせポケモンマスター 2001, Mezase Pokémon Masutā 2001) by Whiteberry for 29 episodes, and "Ready Go!" by Naomi Tamura for 36 episodes. The ending songs are "Face Forward Team Rocket!" (前向きロケット団!, Maemuki Roketto-dan!) by Team Rocket trio for 29 episodes, and "Pocket-ering Monster-ing" (ポケッターリ・モンスターリ, Pokettāri Monsutāri) by Kana for 36 episodes. The English opening song is "Believe in Me" by David Rolfe. A shortened version of the English opening song was used for the end credits.

Home media releases 
In the United States, two three-disc DVD sets were released by Viz Video and Ventura Distribution, which each contained 32 episodes each (10/11 episodes per DVD). These DVDs are now out of print.

Viz Media and Warner Home Video released Pokémon: Master Quest – The Complete Collection on DVD in the United States on October 11, 2016.

Notes

References

External links 
 
  at TV Tokyo 
  at Pokémon JP official website 

2001 Japanese television seasons
2002 Japanese television seasons
Season05